There are many terms for the Germans. In English the demonym, or noun, is German. During the early Renaissance, "German" implied that the person spoke German as a native language. Until the German unification, people living in what is now Germany were named for the region in which they lived: examples are Bavarians and Brandenburgers.

Some terms are humorous or pejorative slang, and used mainly by people from other countries, although they can be used in a self-deprecating way by German people themselves. Other terms are serious or tongue-in-cheek attempts to coin words as alternatives to the ambiguous standard terms.

Many pejorative terms for Germans in various countries originated during the two World Wars.

English

Hun (pejorative) 

Hun (or The Hun) is a term that originally refers to the nomadic Huns of the Migration Period. Beginning in World War I it became an often used pejorative seen on war posters by western Allied powers and the basis for a criminal characterisation of the Germans as barbarians with no respect for civilisation and humanitarian values having unjust reactions.

The wartime association of the term with Germans is believed to have been inspired by an earlier address to Imperial German troops by Kaiser Wilhelm II. What is dubbed the "Hun speech" was delivered on 27 July 1900, when he bade farewell to the German expeditionary corps sailing from the port of Bremerhaven to take part in suppressing the Boxer Rebellion. The relevant part of the speech was:
The Kaiser's speech was widely reported in the European press at that time.

The term "Hun" from this speech was later used for the Germans by British and other Allied propaganda during the war. The comparison was helped by the spiked Pickelhaube helmet worn by German forces until 1916, which would be reminiscent of images depicting ancient warrior helmets (not necessarily that of actual historical Huns). This usage, emphasising the idea that the Germans were barbarians, was reinforced by the propaganda utilised throughout the war. The French songwriter Théodore Botrel described the Kaiser as "an Attila, without remorse", launching "cannibal hordes".
By coincidence, Gott mit uns ("God is with us"), a motto first used in the Kingdom of Prussia and later the German Empire, may have contributed to the popularisation of 'Huns' as British Army slang for Germans by misreading 'uns' for 'Huns'.

The usage of the term "Hun" to describe Germans resurfaced during World War II, although less frequently than in the previous war. For example in 1941, Winston Churchill said in a broadcast speech: "There are less than 70,000,000 malignant Huns, some of whom are curable and others killable, most of whom are already engaged in holding down Austrians, Czechs, Poles and the many other ancient races they now bully and pillage."
Later that year Churchill referred to the invasion of the Soviet Union as "the dull, drilled, docile brutish masses of the Hun soldiery, plodding on like a swarm of crawling locusts." During this time American President Franklin D. Roosevelt also referred to the German people in this way, saying that an Allied invasion into Southern France would surely "be successful and of great assistance to Eisenhower in driving the Huns from France."

Fritz 

British soldiers employed a variety of epithets for the Germans. Fritz, a German pet form of Friedrich, was popular in both World War I and World War II.

Heinie (pejorative) 

The Americans and Canadians referred to Germans, especially German soldiers, as Heinies, from a diminutive of the common German male proper name Heinrich. For example, in the film 1941 the Slim Pickens character calls a German officer "Mr Hynee Kraut!"

Heinie is also a colloquial term for buttocks, in use since the 1920s. In German, Heini is a common colloquial term with a slightly pejorative meaning similar to "moron" or "idiot", but has a different origin.

Jerry 

Jerry was a nickname given to Germans mostly during the Second World War by soldiers and civilians of the Allied nations, in particular by the British. The nickname was originally created during World War I. The term is the basis for the name of the jerrycan.

The name may simply be an alteration of the word German. Alternatively, Jerry may possibly be derived from the stahlhelm introduced in 1916, which was said by British soldiers to resemble a chamber pot or Jeroboam.

Kraut (pejorative) 

Kraut is a German word recorded in English from 1918 onwards as a derogatory term for a German, particularly a German soldier during World War I. The term came up after the American entry into World War I, which followed the Turnip Winter and had resulted in the food trade stop for Germany through neutral states. The analogy of this term is the starving soldier of World War I, who ran out of supplies for a long war-period and needed to eat wild cabbage. The term was American and was also used against German Americans by English Americans on American soil as part of Anti-German sentiment pushed by British war propaganda. It was not widely used by native British back then.

Before the Second World War the term was used in relation to cabbage, because Anti-German boycots and de facto trade limitations hit Germany's food imports. Early American war propaganda used the steering of the language in such a manner that 'Kraut' and 'Krauthead' gave the Germans less dignity.

In the 18th century, poor Swiss German immigrants to the US were described as Krauts because they consumed Sauerkraut. Sauerkraut was also a common food served on German ships to fight scurvy, while the British used lime and got called limey. In Switzerland it was a food preserved for hard winters that could go on for half a year.

The stereotype of a sauerkraut-eating German appears in Jules Verne's depiction of the evil, German industrialist Schultze, who is an avid sauerkraut eater in The Begum's Fortune. Schultze's enemy is an Alsatian who hates sauerkraut but pretends to love it to win his enemy's confidence.

The rock music genre krautrock has been commonplace in music journalism since the early 1970s and is of English invention.

Nazi (pejorative) 

Nazi, a shortening of Nationalsozialist (National Socialist) (attested since 1903, as a shortening of national-sozial, since in German the nati- in national is approximately pronounced Nazi. A homonymic term Nazi was in use before the rise of the NSDAP in Bavaria as a pet name for Ignaz and (by extension from that) a derogatory word for a backwards peasant, which may have influenced the use of that abbreviation by the Nazis′ opponents and its avoidance by the Nazis themselves.

Ted 

"Ted", and "Teds", from Tedeschi, the Italian word for Germans, became the term used by Allied soldiers during the Italian campaign of World War II.

Teuton (poetic) 

In a more poetical sense Germans can be referred to as Teutons. The usage of the word in this term has been observed in English since 1833. The word originated via an ancient Germanic tribe, the Teutons and was (see also Teutonic and the Teutonic Order).

Boche (pejorative) 

Pronounced ,  is a derisive term used by the Allies during World War I, often collectively ("the Boche" meaning "the Germans"). The alternative spellings "Bosch" or "Bosche" are sometimes found. According to a 1916 article in the New York Times magazine Current History, the origin is as follows:

Squarehead (pejorative) 

"Squarehead", a generic derogatory term for people from Germany and Scandinavia; Commonly used for Germans during the First and Second World War, but found in a collection of slang from 1906 relating particularly to German military style.

The term Boxhead, commonly used after World War II within the British Armed Forces in the former West Germany is derived from this.

Erics 

First came to prominence in the English 1983 television show Auf Wiedersehen, Pet. It was a term used by the English and Irish when referring to Germans without them knowing it was them being talked about.

Other countries

Austria

Piefke (pejorative) 

The Austrian ethnic slur for a German is Piefke. Like its Bavarian counterpart Saupreiß (literally: sow-Prussian), the term Piefke historically characterized only the people of Prussia, and not people of other Germanic states. There are two hypotheses on how the term developed; both of them suggest an origin in the 1860s. One theory suggests that the term came from the name of the popular Prussian composer Johann Gottfried Piefke, who composed some of the most iconic German military marches, for example Preußens Gloria and the Königgrätzer Marsch – particularly since Piefke and his brother conducted the Prussian music corps in the parade in Austria following the Prussian victory of the Austro-Prussian War in 1866. The second theory suggests an origin in the Second Schleswig War in 1864, where Prussians and Austrians were allies. A Prussian soldier with the name Piefke and a stereotypically Prussian gruff and snappy manner made such a negative impression on his Austrian comrades that the term came to refer to all Prussians.

Since Prussia no longer exists, the term now refers to the cliché of a pompous northern Protestant German in general and a Berliner in particular. However, the citizens of the free Hanseatic cities and the former northern duchies of Oldenburg, Brunswick and Mecklenburg are also quite offended by the terms Piefke and also by Saupreiß (a slur for any German who is not native Bavarian). In 1990, Austrian playwright Felix Mitterer wrote and co-directed a TV mini-series, Die Piefke-Saga, about Germans on holiday in Tyrol. Sometimes the alteration "Piefkinese" is used. Some Austrians use the playful term "Piefkinesisch" (Pief-Chinese) to refer to German spoken in a distinctly northern German – that is, not Austrian – accent.

Marmeladinger (pejorative) 

The term Marmeladinger originated in the trenches of World War I. It is derived from the German word "Marmelade", which is a fruit preserve.  While Austrian infantry rations included butter and lard as spread, German troops had to make do with cheaper ersatz "Marmelade". They disdainfully called it Heldenbutter "hero's butter" or Hindenburgfett. This earned them ridicule from their Austrian allies who would call them Marmeladebrüder (jam brothers) or Marmeladinger (-inger being an Austrian derivational suffix describing a person through a characteristic item or action). Germans would conversely call Austrians Kamerad Schnürschuh "comrade lace-up shoe" because the Austrian infantry boots used laces while the German boots did not. This term has survived, but it is rarely used.

China

Jiamen (colloquial) 

In Shanghainese, a German can be colloquially called a Jiamen (茄門/茄门), which is an adaptation of the English word "German".

This word carries a somewhat negative meaning of a stereotypical German being proud, withdrawn, cold and serious. Today, this phrase, when pronounced as "Ga-Men", can mean "disdainful, indifferent, or uninterested in someone or something".

Chile 

Among the Mapuche-Huilliche of Futahuillimapu in southern Chile German settlers are known as leupe lonko meaning blond heads.

Czech Republic 

Because the ethnic Germans lived in the Sudeten mountains and Slavic migration went into the agrarian plateau, the Czech language refers to a German with the name Skopčák (skopchāk), meaning "those getting down the hills".

This could be used negatively in the context of the Beneš decrees, the Czech and Communist expulsion of nearly 3 million demilitarized Germans supported by the Western powers, while referring to them as a castrated ram (skopec).

The term was already used in the 1920's 'nationalistic' raids against demilitarized Germans and Jews backed by the new and foreign funded military. It was also used to frame sceptical Czechs, who questioned raids on their longtime neighbors by perceived nobodies or the origins of new "Czechs" voters, who settled in the German cities Czech outskirts in the Sudetenland or even not at all. After the forced dissolution of Austria-Hungary and the Kingdom of Bohemia, the Western and Socialist backed Czechoslovakia originated from neither German or old Czech rule.

Finland 

During the Lapland War between Finland and Germany, the terms saku, sakemanni, hunni and lapinpolttaja (burner of Lapland, see: Lapland War) became widely used among the Finnish soldiers, saku and sakemanni being modified from saksalainen (German).

France

Boches (pejorative, historical) 

Boches is an apheresis of the word alboche, which in turn is a blend of allemand (French for German) and caboche (slang for head).  It was used mainly during the First and Second World Wars, and directed especially at German soldiers.

Casque à pointe (historical) 

Casque à pointe is derived from the French name for the traditional Prussian military helmets worn by German soldiers from the 1840s until World War I. In modern French Sign Language the word for Germany continues to be an index finger pointed to the top of the forehead, simulating the Pickelhaube.

Chleuh (pejorative) 

Chleuh derives from the name of the Chleuh, a Berber ethnic group in Morocco. It also denotes the absence of words beginning in Schl- in French.

Germany

Ossi/Wessi 

The term Ossi, derived from the German word Osten which means east, is used in Germany for people who were born in the area of the former German Democratic Republic.

The term Wessi, derived from the German word Westen which means west, is used in Germany for people who were born or live in the old states of Germany (those that formed the Federal Republic or "West Germany" before reunification). Sometimes it is also modified to "Besserwessi", from the German word Besserwisser which means Know-it-all, reflecting the stereotype that people from the Western part of Germany are arrogant.

In 2010 there was a lawsuit in Germany because a job applicant was denied employment and her application was found to have the notation "Ossi" and a minus sign written on her application documents. A German court decided that denial of employment for such a reason would be discrimination, but not ethnic discrimination, since "East German" is not an ethnicity.

Kartoffel / Biodeutscher / Alman 

The term Kartoffel (German for potato) is a derogatory slang term for people in Germany. In the 19th century it was used to describe areas of Germany in a need of eating potatoes like "potatosaxons". Gastarbeiter used the term "potatoeater" for Germans, while "spaghettieater" meant migrant Italians and "kebabeaters" Turks. However, Germans are consuming on average few potatoes compared to most other Europeans. The term is perceived as provocative by Germans because Kartoffel is connected to poor German times and being boring, what might not be the original meaning the migrants wanted to achieve. Even though it is a different word, it might be seen as the use of the derogatory term Kraut.

It is also used in a humorous way and as a self-denomination to be cool or relaxed, not seeing it as a reason to fight, but as a separation from migrants.

However, in the politicized environment, multiculturalists and their press use the term in a racist way to undermine Germans. This fits the same analogy some migrants give, when they pose themselves as rich owners of a new German car, while getting everything from (perceived) fraud with social benefits or funds from foreign oil / wealth, while they use the term to play with the perceived poorness of Germans driving an older car but paying taxes and duties. The term Kartoffel is exchangable with Biodeutscher and Alman in that context, what features non-German traditions and German migration towards foreigners culture.

The term Saupreiß, derived from the German words Sau (= 'sow') which means female pig and Preuße which means Prussian, is used in Bavaria for people who were born or live in any German area north of the Danube river, or at least north of the Bavarian border. A number of other terms exist. Similar to the Polish Szwab, the term Schwab can be pejorative and be used to express Schwabenhass. Various – more or less good-humoured – nicknames are being used between the different German states or areas, such as Gelbfüßler ("Yellowfeet") for the inhabitants of Baden.

Hungary

Sváb 

The term sváb derives from the German word "Schwaben", describing people from Swabia (ger: Schwaben). The first German-speaking people, Saxon merchants and miners, later becoming Carpathian Germans, first arrived to the Carpathian basin (then mostly under rule of the Kingdom of Hungary) in the 12th century, their numbers and territory of settlement were limited, mainly in towns. In the 18th century various German-speaking peasant groups settled in Hungary in large numbers to inhabit the vast territories being depopulated during the Osman rule, they are known as Danube Swabians (Donauschwaben), though most of their forefathers have Bavarian or Thuringian roots. They settled mainly where the destruction was most severe, especially around Buda (now part of Budapest), Danube valley and southern part of Hungary. Although they have assimilated in large parts until the beginning of the 20th century, they maintained strong cultural identity up to date. These people, and through them German people in general are called svábok (plural), having a hint of pejorative nature.

Labanc 

The term labanc came into use during Rákóczi's War of Independence. It was specifically used for the soldiers fighting for the Austrian/German soldiers of the Habsburg rulers. There are multiple theories about where it came from, such as being a strange concatenation of the German term "Lauf Hans!" (Run Hans!) or the French term Le Blanc (the white one), it might also be a reference to the Hungarian word lobonc which referred to the large, common wig, which used to be common in the Vienna court at the time. Now Labanc is exclusively used for Austrians, but becomes rare in usage as there are no tensions between the two countries. Still however, the expression describes mentality or behaviour that is counter to general Hungarian interest and describes persons not content with "true" Hungarian values.

Israel

Yekke
For the Jews who came from the German speaking world, there was a word in use for many years : "Yekke", in Yiddish and Hebrew. One of the explanations of the name in Hebrew is "Yehudi Kshe Havana"  יהודי קשה הבנה "A Jew who hardly understands" for the so called "stiffness of their mentality".

Italy

Crucco (pejorative) 

The term crucco derived from the Croatian and Slovenian kruh ("bread"). Italian soldiers invented this word during World War I when they captured some hungry Austrian-Croatian and Austrian-Slovenian soldiers who asked for "kruh". Later, during World War II, and still today, applied to all german speaking people.

Tuder / Tudro (pejorative) 

Tudro designates Germans as a people lacking flexibility and fantasy, but also emotional intelligence. It is more widely adopted to describe a sturdy and stupid man. Tudro is mainly used in Northern Italy. Tuder is the Lombard usage of the word.

Latvia

Fricis 

Fricis derives from the German name Fritz.

Zili pelēkie 

Zili pelēkie, literally translated, means "The Blue-Grays", from the Prussian war uniforms of the pre-World War I era. The term appeared in a popular Latvian legionnaire wartime song Ik katru sestdien's vakaru ("Every saturday night") about trouncing the blue-grays after beating up reds (sarkanos) or lice-infested ones (utainos) – the Soviets.

Netherlands and Belgium

Mof (pejorative) 

In Dutch the most common term for the German people, after the regular/official "Duitse", is mof. It is regarded as a pejorative term, used exclusively for Germans and reflecting Dutch resentment of the German occupation of the Netherlands during the Second World War and the respective German actions.

In the late 16th century the area just beyond the current northeast border between the Netherlands and Germany now known as East Frisia and Emsland, as well as the people that lived there, used to be referred to as Muffe. Some time later it evolved into an informal designation, still not a pejorative, of someone from Germany in general; however the term seemed to have died out around 1900. Then it was revived to a far greater use and with negative connotations ever since Germany invaded the Netherlands in 1940.

A popular humorous (but false) etymology of the word mof by the Dutch is that it is a German abbreviation meaning Menschen ohne Freunde ("people without friends").

Germany was known as Mofrika, an amalgamation of mof and Afrika, during WW2.

Pruus(j) 

Pruus or Pruusj, is a friendly but somewhat mocking term, used in the south eastern part of The Netherlands as part of the 'Limburg dialect'.

Poep 

Poep is a term used in the northern eastern part of The Netherlands, in the province of Drenthe, referring to a German from nearby Westphalia. It is said that the etymological reference points to the German word Bube (=boy) yet this is unconfirmed.

 A blaaspoep is a German playing a brass instrument
 blaaspoepenmuziek is German brass band music
 Poepenland refers to Germany

Poland

Fryc (pejorative) 

Means novice, and comes from the German name Fritz, which is a diminutive of Friedrich. German trade and settlements acquainted Poles with this name. German coming to Poland was actually a novice hence was called Fryc.

Szkop (pejorative) 

Contemptuous term for a German soldier of the Wehrmacht during World War II as the word szkop in Polish meant a castrated ram. It also has the meaning of a skopek, meaning a bucket for milk or cream.

Other terms 

Another pejorative term for a German (and, stereotypically, unattractive) woman is niemra, coming from a word "Niemka" (a woman of German nationality). This term can also mean a female German language teacher or German language classes. Similarly, the term for the Germans can be niemiaszki. It does not have to be pejorative, it may be permissive or irreverent, but it may also be used in an almost caressing way. Next term is Helmut that refers to the popular German name. Another pejorative term for a German is szołdra (plural: szołdry). However, it is an old Polish term, out of use nowadays. It can be found in 19th century historical novels by Henryk Sienkiewicz and Józef Ignacy Kraszewski. It comes from a term meaning pork or ham. Next pejorative and historical term is pluder came from Hose (clothing) being the part of warderobe.

Russia 

Fritz,  – the German name Fritz

Gans,  – the German name Hans

Kolbasnik,  – an outdated (used mostly before 1940s) pejorative term, which verbally meant "a sausage-maker".

Spain

Tudesco (historical) 

In Early Modern Spanish (for example in Don Quixote), tudesco (cognate with deutsch and the Italian tedesco) was used sometimes as a general name for Germans and sometimes restricted to Lower Saxony.

Switzerland

Gummihals (pejorative) 

German for rubber-neck. The term has been verified to be in use since the 1970s at least. Its actual meaning is subject to debate. Theories include the stereotype of Germans talking too much or nodding their heads endlessly when listening to superiors.

Schwab (pejorative) 

The ordinary (non-pejorative) meaning is people from Swabia (roughly Baden-Württemberg) in South Germany, neighbouring Switzerland, but in Switzerland it is used for any German. A strengthening is Sauschwabe.

See also 

 Anti-German sentiment
 Barbarian
 List of ethnic slurs by ethnicity
 Names of Germany

References 

Terms
German culture-related lists
Germans
Germans